Notable events of 2012 in webcomics.

Events
Chang Kim launches Tapastic in October 2012.
Andrew Hussie's Hiveswap becomes the most successful webcomic-related Kickstarter project of all time, raising over US$2,000,000.

Awards
Eagle Awards, "Favourite Web-Based Comic" won by Warren Ellis and Paul Duffield's FreakAngels.
Eisner Awards, "Best Digital Comic" won by Mike Norton's Battlepug.
Harvey Awards, "Best Online Comics Work" won by Kate Beaton's Hark! A Vagrant.
Ignatz Awards, "Outstanding Online Comic" won by Jillian Tamaki's SuperMutant Magic Academy.
Joe Shuster Awards, "Outstanding Web Comics Creator" won by Emily Carroll.
Reuben Awards, "On-Line Comic Strips" won by Jonathan Rosenberg's Scenes from a Multiverse.
Aurora Awards, "Best Graphic Novel" won by Tarol Hunt's Goblins.
Hugo Award for Best Graphic Story won by Ursula Vernon's Digger.

Webcomics started

 January 2 — Polar by Victor Santos
 January 25 — As the Crow Flies by Melanie Gillman
 January 25 — O Human Star by Blue Delliquanti
 March 14 — The Young Protectors by Alex Woolfson
 April 18 — Mob Psycho 100 by One
 May 21 — Snarlbear by Natalie Riess
 June 17 — Junior Scientist Power Hour by Abby Howard
 June — Nimona by ND Stevenson
 July – August — The Cliff by Oh Seong-dae
 August 8 — Thunderpaw: In the Ashes of Fire Mountain by Jen Lee
 September 5 — About Death by Sini and Hyuno
 September 25 — Framptown by Josh Roepe
 The Property Of Hate by Sarah Jolley
 Ability by Son Jae-ho and Lee Gwang-su
 Ava's Demon by Michelle Czajkowski
 It's Geek 2 Me by Francis Cleetus
 MediaEntity by Emilie Tarascou and Simon Kansara
 Misaeng by Yoon Tae-ho
 Strong Female Protagonist by Brennan Lee Mulligan and Molly Ostertag
 Soul Cartel by Kim Eun-hyo and Kim Yeong-ji
 Yarichin Bitch Club by Ogeretsu Tanaka

Webcomics ended
 Theater Hopper by Tom Brazelton, 2002 – 2012
 Rob and Elliot by Clay and Hampton Yount, 2004 – 2012
 Sin Titulo by Cameron Stewart, 2007 – 2012
 Along with the Gods by Joo Ho-min, 2010 – 2012
 Bucko by Jeff Parker and Erika Moen, 2011 – 2012
 Artifice by Alex Woolfson, 2011 – 2012

References

 
Webcomics by year